Khaptad National Park is a protected area in the Far-Western Region, Nepal that was established in 1984.

History 
Khaptad Baba moved to the area in the 1940s to meditate and worship. He spent about 50 years as a hermit and became a renowned spiritual saint.

Vegetation
The landscape consists of moorland, steep slopes, and streams. 567 species of flora have been recorded in the protected area. Vegetation types include chir pine-rhododendron forest, oak forest and Himalayan fir-hemlock-oak forest and alder forest in riverine areas.

Fauna 

Current checklists include 23 mammals, 287 birds, and 23 amphibians and reptiles.
Mammal species symbolic of the park are leopard, Himalayan black bear, wild dog, and musk deer. Bird species symbolic of the park include the impeyan pheasant, peregrine falcon, and white-rumped vulture.

Khaptad Baba Ashram 
Khaptad Baba Ashram lies inside Khaptad National park. Khaptad Baba lived in  Triveni located inside the national park and was known as a philosopher, physician, scientist, and astrologer.

Gallery

References

External links

Department of National Parks and Wildlife Conservation, Nepal : Khaptad National Park

National parks of Nepal
1984 establishments in Nepal